The Goodyear Inflatoplane was an inflatable experimental aircraft made by the Goodyear Aircraft Company, a subsidiary of Goodyear Tire and Rubber Company, well known for the Goodyear blimp. Although it seemed an improbable project, the finished aircraft proved to be capable of meeting its design objectives, although orders were never forthcoming from the military. A total of 12 prototypes were built between 1956 and 1959, and testing continued until 1972, when the project was finally cancelled.

Design and development
The original concept of an all-fabric inflatable aircraft was based on Taylor McDaniel's inflatable rubber glider experiments in 1931. Designed and built in only 12 weeks, the Goodyear Inflatoplane was built in 1956, with the idea that it could be used by the military as a rescue plane to be dropped in a hardened container behind enemy lines. The 44 cubic ft (1.25 cubic meter) container could also be transported by truck, jeep trailer or aircraft. The inflatable surface of this aircraft was actually a sandwich of two rubber-type materials connected by a mesh of nylon threads, forming an I-beam. When the nylon was exposed to air, it absorbed and repelled water as it stiffened, giving the aircraft its shape and rigidity. Structural integrity was retained in flight with forced air being continually circulated by the aircraft's motor. This continuous pressure supply enabled the aircraft to have a degree of puncture resilience, the testing of airmat showing that it could be punctured by up to six .30 calibre bullets and retain pressure.

There were at least two versions:
The GA-468 was a single-seater. On 20 US gallons (76 L) of fuel, the aircraft could fly , with an endurance of 6.5 hours. Later, a  engine was used in the aircraft.

Takeoff from turf was in 250 feet with 575 feet needed to clear a 50-foot obstacle. It landed in 350 feet. Rate of climb was 550 feet per minute. Its service ceiling was estimated at 10,000 ft.

The GA-466 was the two-seater version,  shorter, but with a  longer wingspan than the GA-468.

Operational history

The test program at Goodyear's facilities near Wingfoot Lake, Akron, Ohio showed that the inflation could be accomplished with as little as 8 psi (544 mbar), less than a car tire. The flight test program had a fatal crash when Army aviator Lt. "Pug" Wallace was killed. The aircraft was in a descending turn when one of the control cables under the wing came off the pulley and was wedged in the pulley bracket, locking the stick. The turn tightened until one of the wings folded up over the propeller and was chopped up. With the wings flapping because of loss of air, one of the aluminum wing tip skids hit the pilot in the head, as was clear from marks on his helmet. Wallace was pitched out, over the nose of the aircraft and fell into the shallow lake. His parachute never opened. Only 12 Goodyear Inflatoplanes were built, but development continued until the project was cancelled in 1973.

Variants
GA-33 Inflatoplane
The initial single-seat version, with open cockpit, based on the Taylor McDaniel inflatable rubber glider experiments from the early 1930s. One built.
GA-447 Inflatoplane
An enclosed cockpit and new wing, used for undercarriage experiments (tricycle, uniwheel, and hydroskid). One built.
GA-466 Inflatoplane
Company designation for the AO-2 Inflatoplane
GA-468 Inflatoplane
Company designation for the AO-3 Inflatoplane
XAO-2-GI Inflatoplane
Military designation for the GA-466. One built.
XAO-3-GI Inflatoplane
Military designation for the GA-468. Five built.

Surviving aircraft
Goodyear donated two Inflatoplanes for museum display at the end of the project, one to the Franklin Institute in Philadelphia and one to the Smithsonian Institution in Washington, D.C. Another is on display at the Stonehenge Air Museum in Fortine, Montana. A fourth is in storage at the National Naval Aviation Museum in Pensacola, Florida. A fifth is in storage with the Ohio Historical Society in Columbus, Ohio.

Specifications (Goodyear GA-468 Inflatoplane (XAO-3-GI))

References
Notes

Citations

External links

 Inflatoplane
 Aircraft Finder for Goodyear AO (Inflatoplane)
 GA486 at Smithsonian National Air and Space Museum 

Inflatable aircraft
Inflatoplane
1950s United States experimental aircraft
1950s United States military rescue aircraft
Single-engined tractor aircraft
Aircraft first flown in 1956